Iliopsoas bursitis is inflammation of a bursa (synovial sac) lying between iliopsoas muscle and hip joint, lateral to femoral vessels. Pain is experienced over the same area and made worse by extension of hip joint.

References

Soft tissue disorders